In the second half of the nineteenth century, it became clear that the preservation of the power and political influence of the Russian Empire is impossible without reform and transformation of the entire political system. Among the economic prerequisites, it should be noted the crisis of the landlord economy, the poverty of the peasants, the low purchasing power of the population, from which the underdevelopment of the domestic market ensued. Serfdom held back the development of the wage labor market and created a shortage of labor for industry. Therefore, the reign of Alexander II became a period of fundamental transformations of Russian society.

Abolition of serfdom

In February 1861, Emperor Alexander II signed the Emancipation reform of 1861 and the Manifesto. Both documents were distributed in 45 provinces. The development of small business was restrained by the existence of serfdom. Thus, new opportunities for entrepreneurs were opened only after the abolition of serfdom in 1861. The power of the landowners over the peasants was abolished, and the peasants received personal freedom. The former serf became a legal entity that had the right to own property, engage in trade and crafts, marry without the consent of the landowner, initiate legal claims and participate in elections to local governments. The peasants received the estate and the allotment for permanent use, which they could not get rid of earlier than 9 years later. Land left to the peasants remained the legal property of the landowner until the conclusion of the redemption transaction. Prior to its conclusion, the peasants were considered temporarily liable and differed from the serfdom in the more precise fixing of peasant duties by law. The size of the allotment and the volume of duties were fixed by the charter, for the preparation of which was given 2 years. That is why the implementation of the reform began in 1863.

Later, the originally proposed norms were significantly reduced. If the pre-reform allotment was less than the established one, then cutting was provided at the lower rate, and if more, then the surplus was cut off in favor of the landowner. These lands are called segments. Especially a lot of land was cut off from peasants in the Chernozem zone. On average, peasants received 3.3 tithes per male soul, which did not provide them with a living wage. Women were not given land. Another of the injustices of the new land system was that the landowner left most of the grazing land and forests that serfs used to use freely. Now they had to be rented for a fee, which constantly created the basis for clashes between peasants and landowners.

Peasants bought the estate and allotment. The repurchase amount in the Non-Chernozem zone included capitalization of the quitrent. The cost of land purchased by peasants included the price of serf souls. In other words, the bank must be paid such an amount that the annual 6% of it makes an income equal to the rent. Redemption payments included not only the market value of the land received, but also in hidden form the value of the identity of the peasant. The role of the intermediary banker in carrying out the redemption operation was assumed by the government.

The peasants paid the landowner 20% of the redemption amount. The remaining 80% of the cost of land was paid for by the state.  The state provided the peasant with a redemption loan, thus giving him money on credit. The peasants had to pay off installment debt for 49 years in the form of "redemption payments" at the rate of 6% per annum of the redemption amount. In general, the peasants bought not only land, but also the value of serf labor, which enabled the state to cash in on the redemption operation.

Unlike Austria and Prussia, the Russian government did not invest a single ruble in agrarian reform, but managed to make the redemption operation beneficial to the state. The debts of the landowners were transferred to the shoulders of the peasants. They financed the development of the noble economy, helping it grow into capitalism and switch to bourgeois rails. The more the landowner economy was capitalized, the less the peasant had the opportunity to become a farmer. Russian agrarian capitalism was competitive in the world market, remaining backward. Feudal remnants were present, as this guaranteed cheapness and ease of management.

Growth of capitalism

The problem of the serf economy was that in agriculture and industry there were neither conditions for introducing free labor, nor free workers themselves, because the country produced a limited volume of production, and society constantly needed to increase labor in agriculture (in labor serfs).

The development of capitalist relations in agriculture was difficult. Since the extremely extensive system of economy was also severely limited by the conditions of nature and climate. It required large financial investments that are necessary for the development of market relations in connection with the collapse of former ties with the peasant economy.

The transition from subsistence economy to monetary revealed the complete inability of the nobility of the Central Chernozem Earth region to new economic conditions. Consequently, impoverishment of the nobility and even the ruin of its certain layers. A significant part of the landowners could not or did not want to move away from the old and familiar forms of farming. Middle-estate and small-estate nobles were forced to lay their clan nests. The nobles asked to give them a certificate that they did not have any real or movable capital, on the basis of which they asked to accept their children for official maintenance or to write off arrears from them. This noble "prostration", the lack of economic culture, a sufficient amount of necessary equipment and skilled workers led to the "ceased to be nobles" of private ownership of land ownership. The nobles have not yet adapted to the new conditions of the economy; therefore, the desolation of their estates, the ruin of their nests, debts and poverty were only the logical consequences of this inadequacy.

There were noble estates, where the economy, after the reform, was quite "kept afloat". So, on the lands of E.P. Demidova in the estate of the Rastunovo-Shebantsevsky volost, the economy was carried out in the same size. With the amount of land in the estate of 400 acres, the owner managed to keep the same as it was before 1861, from the moment it was acquired in 1848, and in any case until 1877, which is indicated in the source. The only difference was that until 1861 the land was cultivated by corvée peasants, and after the reform by free labor. The economy continued to be maintained in the same mode as before, i.e. 20 farm acres per field and with a three-field system, however, with the active use of fertilizers. The estate had 31 horses and 22 cows until 1861, and after them several horses were added. The amount of plowing remained the same as the size of the sowing, but since serf labor was replaced by hired labor, with fewer working hands and the same space of the cultivated land, more arable land was obtained number of products.

The main source of the formation of an army of wage workers was the liberation of the multimillion masses of the peasantry from serfdom. A smaller part of it (approximately 4 million landless and low-land peasants) was immediately thrown into the free labor market, while the majority came there gradually, as the peasantry became stratified and ruined. By the beginning of the 1880s, the working class in Russia had already formed. Its number then reached 7.35 million people. For 1861–1900, according to A.G. Rashin, it grew numerically from 3.2 to 14 million people (industrial workers – from 720 thousand to 2.8 million), i.e. 4.4 times, while the entire population of the country increased from 70 to 132.9 million people (about 90%).

As for the accumulation of capital, post-reform Russia could use very advantageous, specifically inherent sources. The first of these was the redemption of peasant lands, during which the landlords received 2 billion rubles over 30 years. (of which 750 million – in the first 10 years). The second source was the inflow of foreign capital (since the 60s mainly in railway construction, and since the 70s – in industry). From 1861 to 1881, over 19 thousand kilometers of railways were built. Southern factories began to manufacture rails and equipment for railroads, which had previously been imported from abroad. In the south of Russia, a new industrial area has grown – the Donetsk coal basin (Donbas). In the Caucasus, the Baku oil region developed rapidly, in which valuable liquid fuel was extracted – oil. Foreign capitalists, of course, contributed to the industrial development of Russia, but at first they took over individual enterprises and, eventually, entire branches of production. Tissue production has tripled. Weaving mills supplanted handicraft weaving. Capitalism penetrated into the countryside. Landowners gradually turned into capitalist ones. A wealthy elite — the kulaks — quickly grew up among the peasants. Englishman John Hughes in 1869–1872 built in with. Yuzovka (now Donetsk, Ukraine) The Yuzov Metallurgical Plant, which soon overgrown with its own iron mines and coal mines.

In all sectors, there was a desire to improve the quality of products and to introduce improved production methods that contributed to cheaper production, making goods more accessible to the mass of consumers. The government laid the development of technical educational institutions and the direction of their activities to meet the needs of industry. In connection with the successes of industry, domestic trade was developing, which, according to approximate estimates, amounted to at least 4 billion rubles in goods turnover. The total turnover of foreign trade in imports and exports in total in 1857 reached approximately 300 million rubles and remained at that level until 1864. By 1878, the turnover reached 1,213.6 million rubles, including over 595 million – import and 618 million – export. In 1855, the number of joint-stock companies and companies with a capital of 41.4 million rubles did not exceed 50. By 1880, 506 commercial, industrial, banking insurance, shipping and railway joint-stock companies and companies with a capital of 862.5 million credit and 1 271 300 000 rubles.

Cities not only grew, but also improved. Their layout improved, new buildings appeared, straightened, planted green, paved and paved streets. The water supply system, which until 1861 existed only in Moscow, Saratov, Vilna, Stavropol and Torzhok, began to be built in all major cities. From 1879, electric light appeared on the streets of Russian cities, and from 1882, a telephone appeared in city apartments.

Having joined the world cycle of capitalist production, Russia, together with other countries, experienced economic crises of 1873–1877, a prolonged depression of the second half of the 80s, and a steep industrial upsurge in the 90s. Industrial production in Russia over the last decade of the century has doubled, while in Germany – by 62%, in the United States – by 38%, in England – by 27%. However, the starting positions of the powers before such a jerk were enormously different.

Noble households in the Voronezh province

The abolition of serfdom radically changed the conditions of the economic activity of the nobility. The landowners, in spite of the replacement of the quitrent by corvée, became impoverished one after another; estates were pledged to state and private credit institutions; the capital received from there in most cases did not receive a productive occupation; Noble estates burdened with state and private debts did not increase productive turnover in the landlord economy.

By 1861, the Voronezh province was a typically agricultural region, the vast majority of the province's population was engaged in tillage and animal husbandry. The focus of the activities of the noble households was agrarian, based on the ownership of serfs. The peasants carried "obrok" and "barshina" service with a predominance of "barshina" service. On the eve of the abolition of serfdom in landlords, an extremely rare phenomenon was the use of agricultural machinery and civilian labor (in view of the absence of a pronounced need).

The use of machines was only in large estates of such representatives of the estate as earl A. Kushelev-Bezborodko, Prince I. Vasilchikova. Threshing, reaping and mowing machines were ordered to advanced noble farms. The problem of the non-proliferation of agricultural machinery was caused by the feudal system itself, which made it possible not to care about the quality of production due to the large number of peasant hands. A characteristic feature of the private land tenure of the province, as well as throughout the country, was the predominance of large holdings of over 500 acres. The share of such possessions in the province accounted for more than 70% of privately owned lands.

A significant part of the nobility saw the easiest and most convenient way to earn income on a land lease, providing land primarily to peasants who needed it. Lease relations in the Voronezh province were one of the most developed in the Central Black Earth Region and throughout the European part of Russia. Large estates were characterized by long-term leases (more than 3 years). Landowners leased large areas – up to 10 thousand acres. By 1881, arable land in Voronezh province occupied 69.1% of the land taken for rent, 30.9% – meadows and pastures. Ownership of up to 50 acres was handed over by 3.5% of owners, from 50 to 500 dessiatins. – 19%, over 500 dess. – 26.4%, that is, 48.5% of the noble households leased their land [10].
In the 60–70s. XIX century the cost of renting one tithing of land in the province when removing from 2 to 10 thousand tithing ranged from 2 to 4 rubles for tithing, small land plots were leased for the amount of 6 to 10 rubles for tithing3. According to A. M. Anfimov, the cost of renting one tithe of land in the Voronezh province in 1887–1888. averaged 8.80 rubles., in 1901 – 10.5 rubles., in 1912–1914. – 19.44 rubles [2]

Monetary credit system of Russia

In 1860, to revive trade turnover and strengthen the monetary credit system of Russia, the State Bank was created, which was assigned the role of the main credit institution and the state-controlled source of covering the budget deficit. With the creation of the State Bank, the government was able to borrow the money he needed as necessary without any difficulties.

According to the law of 19 February 1861, the execution of the redemption operation was entrusted to local treasuries (cash duties: reception, storage and vacation of sums), provincial affairs for the presence of the peasants (consideration and approval of redemption transactions, issuance of tickets and certificates for redemption transactions, account management on redemption loans) and state chambers (audit of financial statements on redemption operations of treasuries and provincial presences). Then it was assigned to the Department of the State Treasury and the Department of Salaries and the St. Petersburg State Treasury. The lack of a central institution at the beginning of the redemption operation created such confusion in reporting that the Government was not able to get an accurate picture of its progress. It is possible that the tasks of the institutions that led the redemption operation did not include obtaining reliable data on the results of its operation. After the peasant reform of 1861, nobles were still exempted from most taxes. Until the 1880s, out of the total direct taxes, about 16/17 accounted for the poor rural population and only 1/17 to all other classes. By abolishing serfdom, the state did not revise the tax system.

In 1883, the foundation was laid in the transformation of direct taxes: in the period from 1883 to 1887, the poll tax was completely abolished, instead of which other taxes were introduced. The reform also began in the field of indirect taxes, which looked on the part of the Government as another attempt to solve the budget deficit problem. Nevertheless, the abolition of serfdom gave impetus to the development of industry and trade. In accordance with the report of the Ministry of Finance on its activities from 1855 to 1880, great success was achieved as a result of the reform. Over the 15-year period, the turnover of the factory industry has more than tripled; the turnover in foreign trade has quadrupled. Thanks to the ongoing reforms, it was possible to cover the expenses incurred during the wars.

The system of calculating and controlling state revenues and expenses was transformed. On 22 May 1862, the Rules on the preparation and execution of financial estimates and the state list of income and expenses were approved. The new system made it possible to obtain complete information on government revenues and expenditures. The ways of replenishing the treasury are determined by the wealth of the people and a good management system, the property of taxes and the way they are collected are only of secondary importance. If the state has the right approach to management, the tasks of the Ministry of Finance include finding ways to ensure and increase treasury income without depleting the people.

Business activities

The industrialists were waiting for the peasant reform, realizing that for the development of factory and commercial affairs free hands and a wide labor market were needed. The reform, it would seem, solved this problem, since the peasants, on the one hand, were freed from personal dependence, and on the other, many of them were ready to go to town to earn money. However, at first, other circumstances became decisive. In many factories, at the time of the abolition of serfdom, not workers were employed, but workers attached to them. As soon as these people got freedom, hatred of bonded labor forced them to leave work in droves and leave the factories, selling houses and gardens for nothing. The wages that increased several times did not help return the workers. Therefore, in the first time after the reform, many enterprises reduced production. This was especially characteristic of iron mills and cloth factories, which on a large scale used the labor of serfs. Only 10 years later, having mastered the new conditions, they began to increase their production.

New opportunities for entrepreneurial activity opened up after the reform of 1861. The beginning of the construction of railways made it possible to reorganize the heavy industry in a short time and seriously revive business in joint-stock activities. The development and reorganization of industry at that time was facilitated by the influx of foreign capital. In the 90s of the XIX century. in Russia, the industrial base of entrepreneurship was finally formed and began to be established, and at the beginning of the 20th century it has already become a mass phenomenon.

In the same period, a labor market was formed, a joint-stock form of entrepreneurship was developing, and private joint-stock banks were opened – commercial, land and others. It is curious that by the beginning of the 20th century. in the Russian economy, 2/3 of all industrial production was produced at joint-stock, unit and other enterprises of collective forms of entrepreneurial activity. Moreover, the highest incomes came from investments in cotton production, in trade and credit. Thus, the process of monopolization of firms began.

The abolition of serfdom pushed the accelerated change of feudal serfdom to bourgeois–capitalist relations. Monetary relations began to develop. A number of large-scale industries were created and developed. During this process, the number of industrial workers in both the public and private sectors grew. The number of equipped companies rapidly increased, and the production rate became higher. The market also did not stand still. With the help of a growing network of railways, new capitalist relations spread throughout Russia. A new credit system was created (mutual credit societies, commercial banks). European financial circles also took part in these development.

References
Kornilov A. A. 19th Century Russian History Course. – M., 1993.( Корнилов А. А. Курс истории России XIX века. – М., 1993. )
Troitsky N. A. Lectures on Russian history of the XIX century. – Saratov, 1994. ( Троицкий Н. А. Лекции по русской истории XIX века. – Саратов, 1994. )
Kagarlitsky B. Yu. Peripheral empire: cycles of Russian history. – M., 2009. Litvak B.G. The 1861 coup in Russia: why the reformist alternative was not realized. – M., 1991. ( Кагарлицкий Б. Ю. Периферийная империя: циклы русской истории. – М., 2009. Литвак Б. Г. Переворот 1861 года в России: почему не реализовалась реформаторская альтернатива. – М., 1991. )
The transition from feudalism to capitalism in Russia. Materials of the All-Union discussion. M., 1969. S. 79–80. ( Переход от феодализма к капитализму в России. Материалы Всесоюзной дискуссии. М., 1969. С. 79–80. )
Pankratova A. M. The great past of the Soviet people. – M., 1949. (  Панкратова А. M. Великое прошлое советского народа. – М., 1949. )
GAVO. F. I-30. Op. 1. D. 2288. L. 18 ( ГАВО. Ф. И-30. Оп. 1. Д. 2288. Л. 18 )
Zhigachev E. Debt of private land ownership in Russia / E. Zhigachev // Russian Thought. – 1892. – No. 11. ( Жигачев Е. Задолженность частного земельного владения в России / Е. Жигачев // Русская мысль. – 1892. – No 11 )
Collection of statistical information on the Moscow province. Department of Economic Statistics. M., 1879. ( Сборник статистических сведений по Московской губернии. Отдел хозяйственной стати- стики. М., 1879. )
Milov Leonid Vasilievich History of Russia XVIII-XIX centuries ( Милов Леонид Васильевич История России XVIII-XIX веков )
Review of the activities of the Ministry of Finance for the period from 1855 to 1886 // GARF. F. 678. D. 684. ( Обзор деятельности Министерства финансов за период с 1855 по 1886 г. // ГАРФ. Ф. 678. Д. 684. )
Klyuchevsky, V.O. Russian History / V.O. Klyuchevsky. – M., 2005. ( Ключевский, В. О. Русская история / В. О. Ключевский. – М., 2005. )
Shapovalov, V. A. The nobility of the Central Black Earth Region of Russia during the post-reform period / V. A. Shapovalov. – M. – Belgorod, 2002. ( Шаповалов, В. А. Дворянство Центрально-Черноземного региона России в пореформенный пе- риод / В. А. Шаповалов. – М.–Белгород, 2002. )
Khokhonin, O. M. The landowner economy of the Voronezh province in the late XIX – early XX centuries. / O. M. Khokhonin // Collection From the History of the Central Black Earth Region. – Voronezh, 1976. ( Хохонин, О. М. Помещичье хозяйство Воронежской губернии в конце XIX – начале XX вв. / О. М. Хохонин // Сборник Из истории Центрально-Черноземного края. – Воронеж, 1976. )
Perepelitsyn, A. V. Land lease by peasants of the central chernozem provinces of Russia in the post-reform period / A. V. Perepelitsyn // Social movement and cultural life of Central Russia in the 14th – 20th centuries. Collection of scientific works of Voronezh State University. – Voronezh, 2006. ( Перепелицын, А. В. Аренда земли крестьянами центрально-черноземных губерний России в пореформенный период / А. В. Перепелицын // Общественное движение и культурная жизнь Центральной России XIV–ХХ вв. Сборник научных трудов ВГУ. – Воронеж, 2006. )
Anfimov, A. M. Peasant economy of European Russia. 1881–1904 / A. M. Anfimov. – M., 1980. ( Анфимов, А. М. Крестьянское хозяйство Европейской России. 1881–1904 / А. М. Анфимов. – М., 1980. )
Price Rates. 2003.No6. ( Курс цен. 2003. No6.  )

Economy of Russia
Russian Empire